Neeltje Jannetje "Nel" Karelse (25 January 1926 – 20 October 2015) was a Dutch track-and-field athlete. She competed at 1948 Summer Olympics in the 200 m  and long jump and finished in fifth place in the latter event.

References

1926 births
2015 deaths
Athletes (track and field) at the 1948 Summer Olympics
Dutch female long jumpers
Dutch female sprinters
Olympic athletes of the Netherlands
People from Noord-Beveland
Sportspeople from Zeeland
20th-century Dutch women